The 1983 FIBA Europe Under-16 Championship (known at that time as 1983 European Championship for Cadets) was the 7th edition of the FIBA Europe Under-16 Championship. The cities of Tübingen and Ludwigsburg, in West Germany, hosted the tournament. Yugoslavia won the trophy for the third time and tied with the Soviet Union as the most winning countries in the tournament.

Teams

Preliminary round
The twelve teams were allocated in two groups of six teams each.

Group A

Group B

Knockout stage

9th–12th playoffs

5th–8th playoffs

Championship

Final standings

Team roster
Zoran Livljanić, Bane Prelević, Zoran Jevtić, Jure Zdovc, Miroslav Pecarski, Ivo Nakić, Samir Mujanović, Igor Lukačić, Ivica Mavrenski, Žarko Paspalj, Denis Perić, and Luka Pavićević.
Head coach: Rusmir Halilović.

References
FIBA Archive
FIBA Europe Archive

FIBA U16 European Championship
1983–84 in European basketball
1983 in West German sport
International youth basketball competitions hosted by Germany